Vokesimurex woodringi, common name Woodring's murex, is a species of sea snail, a marine gastropod mollusk in the family Muricidae, the murex snails or rock snails.

Description
The size of the shell varies between 30 mm and 70 mm.

Distribution
This species occurs in the Caribbean Sea
.

References

 Houart R. (2014). Living Muricidae of the world. Muricinae. Murex, Promurex, Haustellum, Bolinus, Vokesimurex and Siratus. Harxheim: ConchBooks. 197 pp.

External links
 

Vokesimurex
Gastropods described in 1945